Cuscatancingo is a municipality in the San Salvador department of El Salvador.

The geographical coordinates are

References
Realtravel information on Cuscatancingo
Travelpost

Municipalities of the San Salvador Department